The 1985-86 Atlanta Hawks seasonwas the franchise's thirty-seventh season in the National Basketball Association and the eighteenth in Atlanta Georgia. The Hawks entered the season with rookies Jon Koncak and Spud Webb. The Hawks were transformed into one of the youngest teams in the NBA. The Hawks were led by "The Human Highlight Reel" Dominique Wilkins. He would have an outstanding year as he led the NBA in scoring with an average of 30.3 points per game. One of the highlights of the season came when Webb (measuring five feet, seven inches) won the NBA Slam Dunk contest during All-Star Weekend. In the second half of the season, the Hawks would be one of the strongest teams in the league. The club won 35 of their final 52 games to finish the season with a record of 50 wins and 32 losses. In the playoffs, the Hawks would eliminate the Detroit Pistons in 4 games. In the 2nd round, the Hawks would be defeated by the Boston Celtics in 5 games.

Draft picks

Roster

Regular season

Season standings

z - clinched division title
y - clinched division title
x - clinched playoff spot

Record vs. opponents

Game log

Regular season

|- align="center" bgcolor="#ffcccc"
| 1
| October 25, 19857:30p.m. EDT
| Washington
| L 91-100
| Wilkins (32)
| Rollins (9)
| Webb (10)
| The Omni10,129
| 0–1
|- align="center" bgcolor="#ffcccc"
| 2
| October 26, 19859:00p.m. EDT
| @ Milwaukee
| L 91–117
| Wilkins (18)
| Levingston (9)
| Williams (7)
| MECCA Arena10,237
| 0–2
|- align="center" bgcolor="#ccffcc"
| 3
| October 29
| New York
| W 102-87
| Dominique Wilkins (22)
| Dominique Wilkins (13)
| Ray Williams (8)
| Omni Coliseum9,901
| 1–2

|- align="center" bgcolor="#ffcccc"
| 4
| November 1, 19857:30p.m. EST
| @ Boston
| L 105–109
| Wilkins (40)
| Wilkins (10)
| Wittman (5)
| Boston Garden14,890
| 1–3
|- align="center" bgcolor="#ccffcc"
| 5
| November 2, 19857:30p.m. EST
| Philadelphia
| W 114–113 (OT)
| Wilkins (28)
| Levingston, Koncak (9)
| Webb (11)
| The Omni12,214
| 2–3
|- align="center" bgcolor="#ffcccc"
| 6
| November 5, 19859:30p.m. EST
| @ Denver
| L 113–128
| Koncak (21)
| Kevin Willis (10)
| Johnson (6)
| McNichols Sports Arena8,691
| 2–4
|- align="center" bgcolor="#ccffcc"
| 7
| November 6
| @ Phoenix
| W 114-106
| Dominique Wilkins (34)
| Dominique Wilkins (9)
| Spud Webb (5)
| Arizona Veterans Memorial Coliseum9,805
| 3–4
|- align="center" bgcolor="#ffcccc"
| 8
| November 8
| @ Golden State
| L 119-130
| Cliff Levingston (23)
| Levingston, Koncak, Willis (6)
| Williams, Johnson, Webb (5)
| Oakland-Alameda County Coliseum Arena14,780
| 3–5
|- align="center" bgcolor="#ccffcc"
| 9
| November 9
| @ L.A. Clippers
| W 97-94
| Cliff Levingston (20)
| Dominique Wilkins (14)
| Eddie Johnson (8)
| Los Angeles Memorial Sports Arena8,716
| 4–5
|- align="center" bgcolor="#ccffcc"
| 10
| November 13
| Phoenix
| W 108-101
| Cliff Levingston (23)
| Cliff Levingston (11)
| Eddie Johnson (10)
| Omni Coliseum4,608
| 5–5
|- align="center" bgcolor="#ccffcc"
| 11
| November 15, 19857:30p.m. EST
| Detroit
| W 122–118
| Wilkins (30)
| Levingston (10)]
| Johnson, Wittman (6)
| The Omni12,924
| 6–5
|- align="center" bgcolor="#ffcccc"
| 12
| November 16
| @ New York
| L 96-103
| Dominique Wilkins (19)
| Tree Rollins (8)
| Eddie Johnson (7)
| Madison Square Garden15,422
| 6–6
|- align="center" bgcolor="#ccffcc"
| 13
| November 20
| Chicago
| W 116-101
| Dominique Wilkins (28)
| Cliff Levingston (17)
| Eddie Johnson (7)
| Omni Coliseum7,179
| 7–6
|- align="center" bgcolor="#ffcccc"
| 14
| November 23, 19857:30p.m. EST
| Utah
| L 106–116
| Wilkins (31)
| Wilkins, Koncak, Rollins (7)
| Johnson (8)
| The Omni6,115
| 7–7
|- align="center" bgcolor="#ffcccc"
| 15
| November 24
| @ Cleveland
| L 90-98
| Cliff Levingston (17)
| Cliff Levingston (11)
| Randy Wittman (8)
| Richfield Coliseum6,145
| 7–8
|- align="center" bgcolor="#ccffcc"
| 16
| November 26
| New York
| W 104-94
| Dominique Wilkins (35)
| Dominique Wilkins (9)
| Randy Wittman (5)
| Omni Coliseum7,488
| 8–8
|- align="center" bgcolor="#ffcccc"
| 17
| November 27, 19858:30p.m. EST
| @ Milwaukee
| L 96–114
| Johnson (24)
| Tree Rollins (8)
| Johnson (8)
| MECCA Arena10,879
| 8–9
|- align="center" bgcolor="#ffcccc"
| 18
| November 29
| @ New Jersey
| L 97-107
| Dominique Wilkins (30)
| Dominique Wilkins (9)
| Eddie Johnson (5)
| Brenden Byrne Arena10,329
| 8–10
|- align="center" bgcolor="#ffcccc"
| 19
| November 30, 19857:30p.m. EST
| Boston
| L 97–102
| Wilkins (24)
| Willis (12)
| Battle (5)
| The Omni13,101
| 8–11

|- align="center" bgcolor="#ccffcc"
| 20
| December 4, 19857:30p.m. EST
| Portland
| W 109–98
| Wilkins (31)
| Rollins (12)
| Rivers (10)
| The Omni4,113
| 9–11
|- align="center" bgcolor="#ccffcc"
| 21
| December 6, 19857:30p.m. EST
| Milwaukee
| W 94–93
| Wilkins (29)
| Wilkins (15)
| Rivers (10)
| The Omni5,562
| 10–11
|- align="center" bgcolor="#ffcccc"
| 22
| December 10, 19857:30p.m. EST
| @ Boston
| L 110–114
| Wilkins (32)
| Wilkins (9)
| Rivers (7)
| Hartford Civic Center14,493
| 10–12
|- align="center" bgcolor="#ccffcc"
| 23
| December 11
| Seattle
|- align="center" bgcolor="#ffcccc"
| 24
| December 13
| @ Indiana
|- align="center" bgcolor="#ccffcc"
| 25
| December 14, 19857:30p.m. EST
| Philadelphia
| W 107–103
| Wilkins (29)
| Wilkins, Willis (8)
| Johnson (9)
| The Omni4,638
| 12–13
|- align="center" bgcolor="#ccffcc"
| 26
| December 17
| New Jersey
|- align="center" bgcolor="#ffcccc"
| 27
| December 19, 19857:30p.m. EST
| Dallas
| L 108–120
| Wilkins (29)
| Levingston, Willis (10)
| Rivers (10)
| The Omni5,867
| 13–14
|- align="center" bgcolor="#ccffcc"
| 28
| December 21, 19857:30p.m. EST
| Houston
| W 123–122
| Wilkins (49)
| Wilkins (11)
| Rivers (10)
| The Omni8,563
| 14–14
|- align="center" bgcolor="#ffcccc"
| 29
| December 27, 19857:30p.m. EST
| @ Washington
| L 109–111
| Wilkins (35)
| Wilkins (14)
| Rivers (5)
| Capital Centre8,178
| 14–15
|- align="center" bgcolor="#ccffcc"
| 30
| December 28
| @ New York

|- align="center" bgcolor="#ccffcc"
| 31
| January 3, 19867:30p.m. EST
| Detroit
| W 111–101
| Wilkins (32)
| Willis (13)
| Rivers (13)
| The Omni15,817
| 16–15
|- align="center" bgcolor="#ccffcc"
| 32
| January 4
| @ Chicago
|- align="center" bgcolor="#ccffcc"
| 33
| January 7
| L.A. Clippers
|- align="center" bgcolor="#ccffcc"
| 34
| January 9, 19867:30p.m. EST
| @ Detroit
| W 110–99
| Rivers (29)
| Wilkins, Willis (11)
| Rivers (6)
| Pontiac Silverdome9,400
| 19–15
|- align="center" bgcolor="#ffcccc"
| 35
| January 10, 19867:30p.m. EST
| @ Boston
| L 108–115
| Wilkins (34)
| Willis (13)
| Webb (6)
| Boston Garden14,890
| 19–16
|- align="center" bgcolor="#ccffcc"
| 36
| January 14
| Sacramento
|- align="center" bgcolor="#ccffcc"
| 37
| January 16
| Cleveland
|- align="center" bgcolor="#ffcccc"
| 38
| January 18, 19867:30p.m. EST
| Boston
| L 122–125 (OT)
| Wilkins (36)
| Koncak (10)
| Johnson (9)
| The Omni16,522
| 21–17
|- align="center" bgcolor="#ccffcc"
| 39
| January 20, 19867:30p.m. EST
| Milwaukee
| W 101–98
| Wilkins (33)
| Willis (17)
| Johnson (11)
| The Omni9,467
| 22–17
|- align="center" bgcolor="#ccffcc"
| 40
| January 22
| Golden State
|- align="center" bgcolor="#ccffcc"
| 41
| January 24
| New York
|- align="center" bgcolor="#ffcccc"
| 42
| January 25, 19867:30p.m. EST
| @ Washington
| L 103–111
| Wilkins (35)
| Willis (12)
| Battle (5)
| Capital Centre7,038
| 24–18
|- align="center" bgcolor="#ccffcc"
| 43
| January 28
| Indiana
|- align="center" bgcolor="#ffcccc"
| 44
| January 29, 19867:30p.m. EST
| @ Detroit
| L 94–107
| Wilkins (30)
| Willis (12)
| Rivers (12)
| Pontiac Silverdome12,386
| 25–19
|- align="center" bgcolor="#ccffcc"
| 45
| January 31, 19867:30p.m. EST
| Detroit
| W 116–103
| Wilkins (36)
| Koncak, Willis (9)
| Rivers (11)
| The Omni12,624
| 26–19

|- align="center" bgcolor="#ffcccc"
| 46
| February 1
| @ New Jersey
|- align="center" bgcolor="#ccffcc"
| 47
| February 4
| @ Cleveland
|- align="center" bgcolor="#ccffcc"
| 48
| February 6
| @ Indiana
|- align="center"
|colspan="9" bgcolor="#bbcaff"|All-Star Break
|- style="background:#cfc;"
|- bgcolor="#bbffbb"
|- align="center" bgcolor="#ffcccc"
| 49
| February 11, 19868:30p.m. EST
| @ Houston
| L 100–113
| Levingston, Webb, Wilkins (13)
| Koncak, Willis (9)
| Battle (5)
| The Summit16,016
| 28–21
|- align="center" bgcolor="#ccffcc"
| 50
| February 13
| @ Sacramento
|- align="center" bgcolor="#ffcccc"
| 51
| February 14, 198610:30p.m. EST
| @ L.A. Lakers
| L 117–141
| Wilkins (29)
| Wilkins (8)
| Rivers (6)
| The Forum17,505
| 29–22
|- align="center" bgcolor="#ccffcc"
| 52
| February 16, 19868:00p.m. EST
| @ Portland
| W 110–101
| Levingston (25)
| Levingston, Willis (11)
| Rivers (10)
| Memorial Coliseum12,666
| 30–22
|- align="center" bgcolor="#ffcccc"
| 53
| February 17
| @ Seattle
|- align="center" bgcolor="#ffcccc"
| 54
| February 19, 19869:30p.m. EST
| @ Utah
| L 105–109
| Wittman (23)
| Levingston (9)
| Rivers (7)
| Salt Palace Acord Arena12,654
| 30–24
|- align="center" bgcolor="#ccffcc"
| 55
| February 21
| Indiana
|- align="center" bgcolor="#ccffcc"
| 56
| February 22
| New Jersey
|- align="center" bgcolor="#ccffcc"
| 57
| February 24, 19867:30p.m. EST
| L.A. Lakers
| W 102–93
| Wilkins (33)
| Willis (18)
| Webb (13)
| The Omni16,522
| 33–24
|- align="center" bgcolor="#ccffcc"
| 58
| February 26
| Cleveland
|- align="center" bgcolor="#ffcccc"
| 59
| February 28, 19867:30p.m. EST
| @ Detroit
| L 103–115
| Wilkins (35)
| Levingston (14)
| Rivers (8)
| Pontiac Silverdome25,888
| 34–25

|- align="center" bgcolor="#ccffcc"
| 60
| March 1
| San Antonio
|- align="center" bgcolor="#ccffcc"
| 61
| March 4, 19867:30p.m. EST
| Philadelphia
| W 128–121
| Wilkins (32)
| Willis (9)
| Rivers (21)
| The Omni13,315
| 36–25
|- align="center" bgcolor="#ccffcc"
| 62
| March 5, 19867:30p.m. EST
| @ Philadelphia
| W 122–114 (OT)
| Wilkins (37)
| Willis (12)
| Wittman (9)
| The Spectrum15,192
| 37–25
|- align="center" bgcolor="#ccffcc"
| 63
| March 7
| @ Chicago
|- align="center" bgcolor="#ccffcc"
| 64
| March 8, 19867:30p.m. EST
| Milwaukee
| W 111–109
| Wilkins (29)
| Willis (12)
| Rivers (11)
| The Omni15,822
| 39–25
|- align="center" bgcolor="#ccffcc"
| 65
| March 11, 19867:30p.m. EST
| Denver
| W 128–116
| Willis (39)
| Willis (21)
| Wittman (5)
| The Omni8,905
| 40–25
|- align="center" bgcolor="#ccffcc"
| 66
| March 12
| @ New Jersey
|- align="center" bgcolor="#ffcccc"
| 67
| March 14, 19867:30p.m. EST
| Boston
| L 114–121
| Wilkins (42)
| Rollins (10)
| Webb (9)
| The Omni16,522
| 41–26
|- align="center" bgcolor="#ccffcc"
| 68
| March 15
| @ New York
|- align="center" bgcolor="#ccffcc"
| 69
| March 17
| Chicago
|- align="center" bgcolor="#ffcccc"
| 70
| March 19
| @ San Antonio
|- align="center" bgcolor="#ccffcc"
| 71
| March 21, 19868:30p.m. EST
| @ Dallas
| W 107–103
| Wilkins (28)
| Rollins (10)
| Webb (10)
| Reunion Arena17,007
| 44–27
|- align="center" bgcolor="#ffcccc"
| 72
| March 22, 19869:00p.m. EST
| @ Milwaukee
| L 98–113
| Wittman (18)
| Levingston (9)
| Davis (10)
| MECCA Arena11,052
| 44–28
|- align="center" bgcolor="#ccffcc"
| 73
| March 25
| @ Cleveland
|- align="center" bgcolor="#ffcccc"
| 74
| March 26, 19867:30p.m. EST
| @ Philadelphia
| L 103–112
| Wilkins (31)
| Wilkins (7)
| Rivers (8)
| The Spectrum14,125
| 45–29
|- align="center" bgcolor="#ccffcc"
| 75
| March 28
| @ Indiana
|- align="center" bgcolor="#ffcccc"
| 76
| March 29
| Cleveland

|- align="center" bgcolor="#ccffcc"
| 77
| April 1, 19867:30p.m. EST
| Washington
| W 107–91
| Wilkins (33)
| Willis (16)
| Rivers (10)
| The Omni6,835
| 47–30
|- align="center" bgcolor="#ffcccc"
| 78
| April 4, 19867:30p.m. EST
| @ Washington
| L 129–135 (OT)
| Wilkins (46)
| Rollins (14)
| Wittman (7)
| Capital Centre9,113
| 47–31
|- align="center" bgcolor="#ffcccc"
| 79
| April 5
| @ Chicago
|- align="center" bgcolor="#ccffcc"
| 80
| April 8
| Chicago
|- align="center" bgcolor="#ccffcc"
| 81
| April 10
| New Jersey
|- align="center" bgcolor="#ccffcc"
| 82
| April 12
| Indiana

Playoffs

|- align="center" bgcolor="#ccffcc"
| 1
| April 17, 19868:00p.m. EST
| Detroit
| W 140–122
| Wilkins (28)
| Rollins, Levingston (8)
| Rivers (16)
| The Omni12,538
| 1--0
|- align="center" bgcolor="#ccffcc"
| 2
| April 19, 19863:30p.m. EST
| Detroit
| W 137–125
| Wittman (35)
| Rollins (14)
| Webb (18)
| The Omni12,964
| 2–0
|- align="center" bgcolor="#ffcccc"
| 3
| April 22, 19868:00p.m. EST
| @ Detroit
| L 97–106
| Wilkins (21)
| Wilkins, Levingston (7)
| Rivers (8)
| Pontiac Silverdome13,312
| 2–1
|- align="center" bgcolor="#ccffcc"
| 4
| April 25, 19868:00p.m. EST
| @ Detroit
| W 114–113 (2OT)
| Wilkins (38)
| Rivers (13)
| Rivers (9)
| Pontiac Silverdome15,288
| 3–1
|-

|- align="center" bgcolor="#ffcccc"
| 1
| April 27, 19861:00p.m. EDT
| @ Boston
| L 91–103
| Willis (18)
| Willis (8)
| Webb (5)
| Boston Garden14,890
| 0–1
|- align="center" bgcolor="#ffcccc"
| 2
| April 29, 19868:30p.m. EDT
| @ Boston
| L 108–119
| Willis (23)
| Willis, Rollins (10)
| Rivers (7)
| Boston Garden14,890
| 0–2
|- align="center" bgcolor="#ffcccc"
| 3
| May 2, 19867:30p.m. EDT
| Boston
| L 107–111
| Wilkins (38)
| Willis (12)
| Rivers (14)
| The Omni12,357
| 0–3
|- align="center" bgcolor="#ccffcc"
| 4
| May 4, 19861:00p.m. EDT
| Boston
| W 106–94
| Wilkins (37)
| Rollins (16)
| Webb (12)
| The Omni12,357
| 1–3
|- align="center" bgcolor="#ffcccc"
| 5
| May 6, 19867:30p.m. EDT
| @ Boston
| L 99–132
| Webb (15)
| Rollins (8)
| Webb (8)
| Boston Garden14,890
| 1–4
|-

Player statistics

Season

Playoffs

Player Statistics Citation:

Awards and records

Awards
Mike Fratello, NBA Coach of the Year Award
Stan Kasten, NBA Executive of the Year Award
Dominique Wilkins, All-NBA First Team

Records

Transactions

Trades

Free Agents

Additions

Subtractions

See also
1985-86 NBA season

References

Atlanta Hawks seasons
Ata
Atlanta Haw
Atlanta Haw